Rudi Studer (born 1951 in Stuttgart) is a German computer scientist and professor emeritus at KIT, Germany. He served as head of the knowledge management research group at the Institute AIFB and one of the directors of the Karlsruhe Service Research Institute (KSRI). He is a former president of the Semantic Web Science Association, an STI International Fellow, and a member of numerous programme committees and editorial boards. He was one of the inaugural editors-in-chief of the Journal of Web Semantics, a position he held until 2007. He is a co-author of the "Semantic Wikipedia" proposal which led to the development of Wikidata.

Education
He obtained a degree (1975) and a PhD (1982) in Computer Science at the University of Stuttgart.

Career and research
From 1985 to 1989 he was project leader and manager at IBM Germany, Institute of Knowledge Based Systems. November 1989 he became professor in Karlsruhe. Since then, he led his research group to become one of the world leading institutions in Semantic Web technology, and he played a leading role in establishing highly acknowledged international conferences and journals in this area.

Rudi Studer was also director in the department Information Process Engineering at and one of the presidents of the Research Center for Information Technology as well as co-founder of the spin-off company ontoprise GmbH that developed semantic applications.

He is a member of Association for Computing Machinery (ACM) and German Informatics Society.

His research interests span over the main topics important for semantic web technology, including knowledge management, knowledge engineering, ontology management, data and text mining, and semantic web services.

Publications
His publications include:
 Knowledge processes and ontologies
 Handbook on ontologies
 Knowledge engineering: Principles and methods
 John Davies, Rudi Studer, Paul Warren (Eds.), Semantic Web Technologies - trends and research in ontology-based systems, John Wiley & Sons. June 2006.
 Rudi Studer, Stephan Grimm, Andreas Abecker (Eds.), Semantic web services: concepts, technologies, and applications, Springer Verlag, Heidelberg. 2007.
 Mark A. Musen, Bernd Neumann, Rudi Studer, Intelligent Information Processing, Kluwer Academic Publishers, Boston/Dordrecht/London. 2002.

References 

1951 births
German computer scientists
Scientists from Stuttgart
Living people
University of Stuttgart alumni
Academic staff of the Karlsruhe Institute of Technology
Semantic_Web_people